Epipremnum is a genus of flowering plants in the family Araceae, found in tropical forests from China, the Himalayas, and Southeast Asia to Australia the western Pacific. They are evergreen perennial vines climbing with the aid of aerial roots. They may be confused with other Monstereae such as Rhaphidophora, Scindapsus and Amydrium.

All parts of the plants are toxic, mostly due to trichosclereids (long sharp cells) and raphides. The plants, commonly known as centipede tongavine, pothos or devil's ivy, depending on species, are typically grown as houseplants in temperate regions. Juvenile leaves are bright green, often with irregularly variegated patterns of yellow or white. They may find host trees by the use of Skototropism.

Etymology 
From the Greek ἐπί (upon) and πρέμνον (stump).

Species 
Epipremnum amplissimum (Schott) Engl. - Queensland, New Guinea, Solomon Islands, Bismarck Archipelago, Vanuatu
Epipremnum aureum (Linden & André) G.S.Bunting - native to Moorea in Polynesia; naturalized in Africa, the Indian Subcontinent, Queensland, Melanesia, Seychelles, Hawaii, Florida, Costa Rica, Bermuda, the West Indies, Brazil, and Ecuador
Epipremnum carolinense Volkens - Micronesia
Epipremnum ceramense (Engl. & K.Krause) Alderw. - Maluku
Epipremnum dahlii Engl. - Bismarck Archipelago
Epipremnum falcifolium Engl. - Borneo
Epipremnum giganteum (Roxb.) Schott - Indochina (Syn. Monstera gigantea (Roxb.) Schot)
Epipremnum meeboldii K.Krause - Manipur region of India
Epipremnum moluccanum Schott - Maluku
Epipremnum moszkowskii K.Krause - western New Guinea
Epipremnum nobile (Schott) Engl. - Sulawesi
Epipremnum obtusum Engl. & K.Krause - Papua New Guinea
Epipremnum papuanum Alderw. - Papua New Guinea
Epipremnum pinnatum (L.) Engl. - widespread across Southeast Asia, southern China, New Guinea, Melanesia, northern Australia; naturalized in West Indies
Epipremnum silvaticum Alderw. Sumatra

Fossil record
3 fossil seeds of  †Epipremnum crassum have been described from middle Miocene strata of the Fasterholt area near Silkeborg in Central Jutland, Denmark. Fossils of this species have also been reported from the Oligocene and Miocene of Western Siberia and the Miocene and Pliocene of Europe.

References

Bibliography

External links
 
 
 Epipremnum information

 
Araceae genera